Hayden James Richard Powell (born 25 September 1983 in England) is a jazz trumpeter and composer based in Oslo, Norway. Powell is English, but moved to Norway as a child and grew up in Molde. He has collaborated with numerous musicians including Terje Rypdal, Kenny Wheeler, Eirik Hegdal, Vigleik Storaas, Nils-Olav Johansen, Ole Morten Vågan, Eyolf Dale, and Ståle Storløkken, and released his debut solo album The Attic in 2011.

Career
Powell holds a bachelor in Performing jazz from the Jazz program at Trondheim Musikkonservatorium (2006), and completed the masters at Norges Musikkhøgskole in 2011. He started his career at 13 in the jazz band Dixi in Molde, they released four albums.

Later he played with Magic Pocket, Trondheim Jazz Orchestra and Jens Carelius in addition to his own trio. Powell received  jazz scholarship from "Sparebank 1" at Moldejazz (2006), "Trondheim jazzfestivals" talent award (2009), and was with the band Magic Pocket JazZtipendiat in 2009/2010. This scholarship, which is awarded by "Midtnorsk jazzsenter", Moldejazz and "Sparebank 1", amounts  kr and gives the recipient the opportunity to write a commissioned work for Trondheim Jazz Orchestra at Moldejazz the following year. The result of this commissioned work was documented on the album Kinetic Music with Trondheim Jazz Orchestra & Magic Pocket.

As composer Powell, in addition to the aforementioned, has written commission works for big band (e.g. "Midtnorsk Ungdomsstorband", "Big Boss Band", "Ett Fett Storband"), brass bands ("Luftforsvarets Musikkorps", "Bispehaugen Ungdomskorps") and a number of smaller ensembles. He has also written a mini-opera based on the novel about «Dr Jekyll and Mr Hyde» (2006), and made musical arrangements to Jens Carelius' album The Architect (2011).

Discography (in selection)

Solo albums 
2011: The Attic (Inner Ear), as Hayden Powell Trio including Eyolf Dale & Jo Skaansar
2013: Roots and Stems (Periskop Records)
2015: Circadian Rhythm & Blues (Periskop Records)

Collaborations 
With Dixi
1998: Just Over in the Dixi-Land
1999: Some of Those Days
2002: Going to the Mardi Gras (Herman Records)
2005: The New Orleans Sessions

With Trondheim Jazz Orchestra
2006: Tribute (MNJ Records), with Vigleik Storaas
2007: Live in Oslo (MNJ Records), with Maria Kannegaard Trio
2009: Live at Moldejazz (MNJ Records), with Kobert
2009: What if: A Counterfactual Fairytale (MNJ records), with Erlend Skomsvoll
2011: Kinetic Music (MNJ Records), with Magic Pocket
2011: Migrations (MNJ Records), with Øyvind Brække

With others
2009: Vi som ser i mørket (Grappa Music), with Siri Nilsen
2009: Live at Dokkhuset (Komponist og dirigent, MNJ Records), with "Midtnorsk Ungdomsstorband"
2010: Den Blåaste Natt (Talik Records), with Jo Skaansar
2011: The Katabatic Wind (Bolage Records), with Magic Pocket & Morten Qvenild
2011: The Architect (Jansen Plateproduksjon), with Jens Carelius
2011: Katedral For Tapte Drømmer (Kirkelig Kulturverksted), with Solfrid Molland

References

External links

1983 births
Norwegian military musicians
Living people
Norwegian jazz composers
Norwegian jazz trumpeters
Male trumpeters
21st-century Norwegian trumpeters
Musicians from Molde
Male jazz composers
21st-century Norwegian male musicians
Trondheim Jazz Orchestra members
Magic Pocket members